James Lloyd Otis (born April 29, 1948) is an American former professional football player who was a running back in the National Football League (NFL) for nine seasons during the 1970s.  Otis played college football for Ohio State University, and was recognized as an All-American.  He played professionally for the New Orleans Saints, Kansas City Chiefs and St. Louis Cardinals of the NFL.

Early years
Otis was born in Celina, Ohio.  He attended Celina High School, and played for the Celina Bulldogs high school football team.

College career
Otis attended the Ohio State University, where he was a fullback for the Ohio State Buckeyes football team from 1967 to 1969.  He led the team in rushing every year of his college career.  As a senior in 1969, he was as a consensus first-team All-American, and was seventh in the vote for the Heisman Trophy.

Otis was inducted into the Ohio State Varsity O Hall of Fame in 1996.  In the Ohio State record book, he remains second only to Archie Griffin among Ohio State running backs in career rushing yards per game.  In 2000, Otis was selected to the Ohio State Football All-Century Team.

Professional career
Otis was drafted by the New Orleans Saints in 1970. The following year, he was traded to the Kansas City Chiefs. However, Otis played the last six years of his nine-year NFL career with the St. Louis Cardinals (NFL). Otis's most successful year as a professional was in 1975, when he rushed for an NFC-leading 1,076 yards and was selected to the Pro Bowl.  Otis beat Minnesota's Chuck Foreman by 6 yards, thus preventing Foreman (who led the NFC in touchdowns and receptions that year) from achieving a rare Triple Crown.

Family
Otis's father, Dr. James John Otis, had been the roommate and best friend of Ohio State head coach Woody Hayes when both men were members of the Sigma Chi fraternity of Denison University in the 1930s. To avoid any appearance of impropriety, Hayes broke off all social contact with the elder Otis during the son's college career. Dr. Otis lived and operated a medical practice in Celina, Ohio.

Otis's son, James John Otis II, was a star high school quarterback in the St. Louis area. He was invited to Ohio State in 2001 as a preferred walk-on and lettered in 2003 for special teams play. Jim Otis's other son, Jeff Otis, has been under contract with five NFL teams and is currently a free agent.

References

1948 births
Living people
All-American college football players
American football running backs
Kansas City Chiefs players
National Conference Pro Bowl players
New Orleans Saints players
Ohio State Buckeyes football players
People from Celina, Ohio
Players of American football from Ohio
St. Louis Cardinals (football) players